Schofield may refer to:

People
 Schofield (name), including a list of people and fictional characters with the name

Places
 Schofield, Missouri, United States
 Schofield, Wisconsin, United States
 Schofields, New South Wales, Australia

Other uses
 Schofield Barracks, Hawaii, a U.S. Army installation
 Schofield revolver, a variant of the Smith & Wesson Model 3
 Schofield tank, a New Zealand tank design of the Second World War

See also

Schofields (disambiguation)
Scofield (disambiguation)
Scholefield, a surname